Dita is a genus of moths in the family Oecophoridae.

Species
Dita fasciatipedella (Zeller, 1874)
Dita morani Urra, 2012
Dita palmai Urra, 2012
Dita phococara Clarke, 1978

References

Oecophorinae